A constitutional referendum was held in Bulgaria on 16 May 1971. Voters were asked whether they approved of a new constitution (known as the Zhivkov Constitution). The new constitution defined Bulgaria as a "socialist state of the working people from the cities and the villages", led by the Bulgarian Communist Party in cooperation with the Bulgarian Agrarian National Union. The result was reportedly 99.7% in favour, with a voter turnout of 99.7%.

Results

References

1971 referendums
1971 in Bulgaria
Referendums in Bulgaria
Constitutional referendums
May 1971 events in Europe